Histone deacetylase complex subunit SAP130 is an enzyme that in humans is encoded by the SAP130 gene.

Function 

SAP130 is a subunit of the histone deacetylase (see HDAC1; MIM 601241)-dependent SIN3A (MIM 607776) corepressor complex (Fleischer et al., 2003).[supplied by OMIM]

Interactions 

SAP130 has been shown to interact with:

 CSN1S1, 
 CUL2,
 Myc, 
 SIN3A,  and
 Von Hippel–Lindau tumor suppressor and

Model organisms 

Model organisms have been used in the study of SAP130 function. A conditional knockout mouse line called Sap130tm1a(KOMP)Mbp was generated at the Wellcome Trust Sanger Institute. Male and female animals underwent a standardized phenotypic screen to determine the effects of deletion. Additional screens performed:  - In-depth immunological phenotyping

References

Further reading